38 Arietis (abbreviated 38 Ari) is a variable star in the northern constellation of Aries. 38 Arietis is the Flamsteed designation. It was once designated 88 Ceti, forming part of the neighboring constellation of Cetus. With an  apparent visual magnitude of +5.18, it is bright enough to be viewed with the naked eye.

The spectrum of this star matches a stellar classification of A7 III-IV, with the luminosity class of III-IV indicating it shows traits part way between the subgiant and giant star stages of its evolution. It is a Delta Scuti variable with a period of 0.0355 days (51 minutes) and a magnitude change of 0.040. This star is larger than the Sun, with more than double the Sun's radius and 11 times the luminosity. This energy is being radiated into outer space from the atmosphere at an effective temperature of 7,638 K, giving it the white-hued glow of an A-type star.

References

External links
HEASARC
Aladin previewer
Aladin sky atlas
 HR 812

Aries (constellation)
017093
012832
Delta Scuti variables
Arietis, 38
Arietis, UV
0812
Durchmusterung objects